Albertus Paul de Wet (born 16 March 1996) is a South African rugby union player for the  in the United Rugby Championship and  in the Currie Cup and in the Rugby Challenge. His regular position is scrum-half.

References

South African rugby union players
Living people
1996 births
People from Stellenbosch
Rugby union scrum-halves
Stormers players
Western Province (rugby union) players
Rugby union players from the Western Cape